Selja is a village in Tori Parish, Pärnu County in southwestern Estonia.

Tori railway station on the Edelaraudtee's western route is located in Selja.

References

 

Villages in Pärnu County